Tim Cahill (born 1979) is an Australian former footballer.

Tim Cahill may also refer to:
Tim Cahill (politician) (born 1959), Treasurer and Receiver-General of the Commonwealth of Massachusetts; 2010 candidate for Governor of Massachusetts
Tim Cahill (writer) (born 1944), founding editor at Outside magazine and adventure travel book author
Tim Cahill (producer) (born 1966), creator and director for My Gym Partner's a Monkey and Littlest Pet Shop
Tim Cahill: The Unseen Journey, a documentary about the Australian footballer

See also
Cahill (group), a band named after the soccer player